Elk Ridge may refer to:

 Elk Ridge (Maryland), a mountain ridge of the Blue Ridge Mountains in Maryland
 Elk Ridge, Utah, a city in Utah County, Utah, United States
 Elk Ridge Ski Area, a ski area and resort in Coconino County, Arizona, USA

See also
 Elkridge (disambiguation)